John Thoney or John Thoeny [Bullet Jack] (December 8, 1879 – October 24, 1948) was a reserve outfielder / infielder in Major League Baseball who played from 1902 through 1911 for the Cleveland Bronchos (1902–1903), Baltimore Orioles (1902), Washington Senators (1904), New York Highlanders (1904), and Boston Red Sox (1908–1911). He was born in Fort Thomas, Kentucky.

In a six-season career, Thoney was a .237 hitter (216-for-912) with three home runs and 73 RBI in 264 games, including 112 runs, 23 doubles, 12 triples and 42 stolen bases. He made 225 appearances at left field (97), center field (52), third base (31), right field (15), second base (19), and shortstop (11).
 
Thoney was born to a family of German descent. He died at the age of 68 in Covington, Kentucky.

References

External links
Baseball Reference
Retrosheet

1879 births
1948 deaths
American people of German descent
Major League Baseball infielders
Major League Baseball outfielders
Baltimore Orioles (1901–02) players
Boston Red Sox players
Cleveland Bronchos players
New York Highlanders players
Washington Senators (1901–1960) players
Baseball players from Kentucky
Wheeling Stogies players
Columbus Senators players
Montreal Royals players
Rochester Bronchos players
Indianapolis Indians players
Toronto Maple Leafs (International League) players
Jersey City Skeeters players